This is a list of largest meteorites on Earth. Size can be assessed by the largest fragment of a given meteorite or the total amount of material coming from the same meteorite fall: often a single meteoroid during atmospheric entry tends to fragment into more pieces.

The table lists the largest meteorites found on the Earth's surface.

Iron

Stony-Iron

See also
Glossary of meteoritics

References

External links
Find Planets in the Sky (continued)
Meteoritical Bulletin: Search the Database
Natural History Museum

Meteorites